Hans Roth can refer to:

 Hans Roth (gymnast) (born 1890), German gymnast
 Hans Roth (wrestler) (1903-1964), Swiss wrestler